The Men's 200 metre individual medley S7 event at the 2020 Paralympic Games took place on 27 August 2021, at the Tokyo Aquatics Centre.

Records

Heats 
The swimmers with the top 8 times, regardless of heat, advanced to the final.

References 

Swimming at the 2020 Summer Paralympics